One by One is a 1968 western film directed by Rafael R. Marchent, scored by Elsio Mancuso and starring Peter Lee Lawrence, William Bogart, Dianik Zurakowska, Eduardo Fajardo, Cris Huerta and Sidney Chaplin.

Cast

Release
One By One was first distributed in 1968. It was released in Spain in 1969 where it sold 927,481 tickets. It was also released as One Against One... No Mercy.

See also 
 List of Italian films of 1968

References

Sources

External links
 

Spanish Western (genre) films
Films directed by Rafael Romero Marchent
Films with screenplays by Marino Girolami
Films shot in Madrid
Films shot in Almería
1968 Western (genre) films
1968 films